The Grünstadt–Altleiningen railway or Leiningen Valley Railway was a 10.7 kilometre long branch line from Grünstadt to Altleiningen in the northeastern Palatinate Forest of Germany. The line opened in 1903. In 1967, passenger services were withdrawn and, in the period that followed, the section between Maihof-Drahtzug and Altleiningen was lifted. Goods traffic continued on the remaining section until the end of 2005.

References

Literature 
 
Heinz Sturm Die pfälzischen Eisenbahnen. pro MESSAGE, 2005

External links 

 Trip report

Standard gauge railways in Germany
Railway lines in Rhineland-Palatinate
Buildings and structures in Bad Dürkheim (district)
Transport in Rhineland-Palatinate